Aston Donald McEachin (October 10, 1961 – November 28, 2022) was an American politician and lawyer who served as the U.S. representative for Virginia's 4th congressional district from 2017 until his death in 2022. His district was based in the state capital, Richmond; it included much of the area between Richmond, a portion of its suburbs, and Hampton Roads.

A member of the Democratic Party, McEachin served in the Virginia House of Delegates from 1996 until 2002 and then served an additional term from 2006 until 2008.  McEachin ran for the open seat of Virginia's 4th congressional district vacated in 2016 by Randy Forbes of the Republican Party and won the general election with 57.3% of the vote. In 2001, McEachin was the Democratic nominee in the Virginia Attorney General election, which he lost to Jerry Kilgore.

McEachin was the first African American nominated by a major party for Virginia attorney general. He was the third African American elected to Congress from Virginia and the second elected from the state since the 19th century.

Early life, education, and legal career
McEachin was born in Nuremberg, West Germany, while his father was serving in the United States Army. He attended St. Christopher's School in Richmond. In 1982, he received a bachelor's degree in political history from American University. After that, he attended the University of Virginia School of Law, where he received a J.D. in 1986. He also received a Master of Divinity from Virginia Union University in 2008. In 2012, he was awarded honoris causa membership in Omicron Delta Kappa, the National Leadership Honor Society.

McEachin began to practice law in Richmond after completing law school, eventually becoming a partner in his own firm, McEachin and Gee.

Virginia Legislature
McEachin was first elected to the House of Delegates from the 74th district in 1995. After three terms there, he ran in the 2001 Virginia Attorney General election. He won a four-way Democratic primary with 33.6% of the vote, but lost the general election to Republican nominee Jerry Kilgore by 20 percentage points.

In 2005 he ran again for the 74th House district, defeating his predecessor, Floyd Miles, by 44 votes in the Democratic primary, and winning the general election with 75% of the vote.

In 2007, McEachin ran for the state senate, challenging 9th district incumbent Benjamin Lambert, who drew criticism within the Democratic Party for his endorsement of Republican U.S. Senator George Allen in Allen's unsuccessful 2006 reelection campaign against Jim Webb. After defeating Lambert 58%-42% in the primary, McEachin won 81% of the vote against independent Silver Persinger in the general election.

McEachin was unopposed for reelection in 2011.

United States House of Representatives

Committee assignments
McEachin was a member of the following committees and subcommittees during the 117th Congress:
Committee on Energy and Commerce
Subcommittee on Communications and Technology
Subcommittee on Energy
Subcommittee on Environment and Climate Change 
Committee on Natural Resources
Energy and Mineral Resources
Oversight and Investigations
Select Committee on the Climate Crisis

Caucus memberships
New Democrat Coalition
Congressional Black Caucus

Electoral history

In 2001, he was the Democratic nominee for Attorney General of Virginia but lost to Jerry Kilgore. In June 2020, McEachin defeated R. Cazel Levine in the Democratic primary. That November, he defeated Republican nominee Leon Benjamin, Sr., in the general election. In 2022, McEachin defeated Levine again, with 80% of the primary vote. In November 2022, he defeated Benjamin again with 61.6% of the vote. An election to replace McEachin was held on February 21, 2023.

Illness and death

He advocated regular testing for colon cancer/colorectal cancer, telling attendees at a 2022 special screening of the film Black Panther: Wakanda Forever, "Don't fool around. Don't go through my journey", two weeks before his death. The actor who played the character Black Panther in the Marvel Cinematic Universe, Chadwick Boseman, had died of colon cancer in 2020, and Black Panther: Wakanda Forever was the first film featuring the character to be released since Boseman's death.

McEachin died at his home in Richmond of complications of cancer on November 28, 2022, at the age of 61. His death came a few weeks after his reelection to a fourth term in the 2022 elections. Tributes to McEachin were paid by outgoing Speaker of the House Nancy Pelosi, as well as fellow Virginia Democratic representative Gerry Connolly and both of Virginia's U.S. Senators, Mark Warner and Tim Kaine (who had known McEachin since 1984). McEachin was succeeded by Jennifer McClellan, who won a special election on February 21, 2023.

He is buried in the Mount Calvary Cemetery in Richmond, Virginia.

Personal life 
McEachin and his wife, Colette, had three children and lived in Richmond. In 2019, Colette McEachin became interim Commonwealth's Attorney for Richmond (having served in that office for 20 years), won the Democratic nomination on August 10, and was unopposed in the special election on November 5.

On August 25, 2015, McEachin's name was found on the userlist leaked from the data breach of the Ashley Madison website. His response was, "At this time, this is a personal issue between my family and me. I will have no further statement on this issue."

See also
 List of African-American United States representatives
 List of United States Congress members who died in office (2000–)

References

External links

 
 

 
 

1961 births
2022 deaths
20th-century African-American politicians
20th-century American lawyers
20th-century American politicians
21st-century African-American politicians
21st-century American lawyers
21st-century American politicians
African-American members of the United States House of Representatives
African-American state legislators in Virginia
American University alumni
Candidates in the 2001 United States elections
Deaths from cancer in Virginia
Deaths from colorectal cancer
Democratic Party members of the United States House of Representatives from Virginia
Democratic Party members of the Virginia House of Delegates
Democratic Party Virginia state senators
Elected officials who died without taking their seats
Lawyers from Richmond, Virginia
People from Henrico County, Virginia
People from Nuremberg
Politicians from Richmond, Virginia
St. Christopher's School (Richmond, Virginia) alumni
University of Virginia School of Law alumni
Virginia Union University alumni